Nepal Ratna Man Padavi (Order of the Jewel of Nepal) is the highest civilian award of Nepal. Instituted in 2010, the award is conferred for exemplary contributions to the nation of Nepal.

History 

Order of Tri Shakti Patta was instituted by King Tribhuvan of Nepal in on 27 November 1937. It had 5 classes plus a medal. The first class "Jyotirmaya-Subikhyat-Tri-Shakti-Patta" was regarded as the highest civilian award of that time.

After the end of monarchy in 2008, the new government adapted the award, "Nepal Ratna Man Padavi". The government makes the decision to whom to give the award and it is conferred by the President of Nepal on Republic Day, 29 May. The decoration is an octagon having 8.5 cm diameter and bejewelled with five diamond pieces on every corner.

Recipient

References 

Orders, decorations, and medals of Nepal
Civil awards and decorations of Nepal
Awards established in 2010
2010 establishments in Nepal